CppUnit is a unit testing framework module for the C++ programming language. It allows unit-testing of C sources as well as C++ with minimal source modification. It was started around 2000 by Michael Feathers as a C++ port of JUnit for Windows and ported to Unix by Jerome Lacoste. The library is released under the GNU Lesser General Public License.

The framework runs tests in suites. Test result output is sent to a filter, the most basic being a simple pass or fail count printed out, or more advanced filters allowing XML output compatible with continuous integration reporting systems.

The project has been forked several times. The freedesktop.org version at GitHub, maintained by Markus Mohrhard of the LibreOffice project (which uses CppUnit heavily), was actively maintained until 2020, and is used in Linux distributions such as Debian, Ubuntu, Gentoo and Arch.


See also

List of unit testing frameworks

Further reading

References

External links
   (freedesktop.org version)

C++ libraries
Extreme programming
Freedesktop.org
Unit testing frameworks